Long Time Comin' is the fourth studio album by the American country music band Shenandoah. Released in May 1992 (see 1992 in country music), it was their first album for the RCA Nashville label. The album includes three singles: "Rock My Baby", "Hey Mister (I Need This Job)" and "Leavin's Been a Long Time Comin'". Respectively, these peaked at #2, #28 and #15 on the Billboard country singles charts in 1992.

Track listing

AOmitted from cassette version.

Chart performance

References
[ Long Time Comin' ] at Allmusic
 liner notes from "Long Time Comin'"

1992 albums
RCA Records albums
Shenandoah (band) albums
Albums produced by Robert Byrne (songwriter)
Albums produced by Keith Stegall